Bazjon Tragaj (born 16 August 1988) is an Albanian professional footballer. The defender most recently played for Dinamo Tirana in the Albanian First Division.

Club career
Bazjon Trogaj was an Albanian defender he joined KS Besa Kavaje at young age and was put in the youth team at the Albanian club.  At the age of just 18 he joined the senior team at the club after working his way up the ranks. In 2012 he left KS Besa for FK Dinamo after 6 years and 55 appearances.  He stayed until 2018 when he retired, making 104 appearances and 2 goals for FK Dinamo.

International career
Trogaj made only one appearance – Albania national under-21 football team.

Honours 
Besa
 Albanian Cup (2): 2006–07; 2009-10.
 Albania SuperCup (1): 2010-11

References

External links
 

1988 births
Living people
Footballers from Kavajë
Albanian footballers
Albania under-21 international footballers
Association football defenders
Besa Kavajë players
FK Dinamo Tirana players
Kategoria Superiore players
Kategoria e Parë players